The Kindreds, or simply Kindred, is the name of several fictional characters appearing in American comic books published by Marvel Comics. Initially introduced in 2004 as Gabriel and Sarah, the alleged twin children of Norman Osborn and Gwen Stacy, with Gabriel becoming the Grey Goblin and later the second American Son, their true origin is later revealed during the Sinister War story-arc as a series of constantly dying and recreated clones created by a corrupted A.I. copy of Harry Osborn, that were then transformed into demonic revenants by Mephisto as Kindred (along with both the mastermind A.I. Osborn and the trapped soul of the deceased human Osborn).

Fictional character biography

Sins Past

The story arc "Sins Past" by J. Michael Straczynski reveals that Gwen Stacy fell pregnant with twins after having sex with Norman Osborn, a boy and a girl to whom were given birth while in France. Gwen vowed to raise the twins with Peter Parker and refused to allow Norman access. Seeing Gwen as a threat to his potential heirs, the Green Goblin killed Gwen. Norman then raised Gwen's two children, a boy named Gabriel and a girl named Sarah. Due to Norman's enhanced blood, the twins aged about 2-3 times faster than normal and were adults within the span of a few years (speculated to be between five and nine years old). Osborn told the twins that Peter was really their father and was responsible for their mother's death. Gabriel and Sarah then attack Spider-Man, and Spider-Man subsequently deduces their true identities thanks to a note they sent that had been written by Gwen while in Paris. However, seeking to confirm it, Peter goes to Gwen's grave and digs up a sample of Gwen's DNA to compare to the twin's DNA which was obtained from the letter's envelope. During a brief confrontation with Sarah just after the DNA analysis completed, Spider-Man learns that she clearly resembles her mother, but is forced to escape when Gabriel attacks. Peter tells Mary Jane Watson about the initial encounter with Gabriel and Sarah, whereupon Mary Jane reveals of knowing about Norman's involvement with Gwen and tells all to Peter. Mary Jane has kept it from Peter all these years because Gwen was distraught and begged Mary Jane not to say anything, as well as not wanting to taint Peter's memory of the only woman Peter ever loved as much as — if not more than — Mary Jane. Arranging a press conference, Spider-Man tells Gabriel and Sarah to meet on the bridge where Gwen died, telling the truth about the twin's origins. Sarah believes Spider-Man — concluding that Peter would never have dug up Gwen's grave to acquire a DNA sample if there was even a chance of being their father, Spider-Man having never even run his own DNA against theirs because Peter and Gwen never reached that stage in their relationship — but Gabriel does not, resulting in him attempting to attack Spider-Man only to accidentally shoot Sarah. With their metabolisms out of control due to the Goblin formula within their metabolism, Gabriel returns to a secret Goblin base that Osborn told them to travel to after they had completed their mission, taking more Goblin formula as the Grey Goblin which apparently stabilized his aging problem at the cost of what remains of his sanity while Sarah is taken to hospital and is given a transfusion of Spider-Man's blood while in the hospital. Spider-Man's abnormal blood also serving to stabilize her condition, both physically and mentally (with Mary Jane imagining Spider-Man 'kicking Norman's ass' on a cellular level as Spider-Man's blood defeats the Goblin formula anomalies in Sarah's system). When the Goblin tries to attack the weakened Spider-Man, Sarah shoots the Goblin's glider, recognizing that Spider-Man is not responsible for their mother's death, causing an explosion that results in her brother vanishing. Sarah flees from the hospital, while Gabriel is later found washed up on a beach with no memory of what happened.

Sins Remembered
A follow-up story titled "Sins Remembered" was written by Samm Barnes with art by Scot Eaton. Peter locates Sarah in Paris, where Sarah has her amnesiac brother restrained in her home. With the help of Spider-Man and Interpol, Sarah helps build a case against the criminal Monsieur Dupres in exchange for the Interpol's help with her rapid-aging disease which is causing her and Gabriel severe headaches. But during this time Gabriel escapes, prompting Sarah to join Interpol in hopes of finding her brother. This story arc was later collected as a trade paperback in 2005 as The Spectacular Spider-Man vol. 5: Sins Remembered.

Straczynski ultimately wished to retcon the characters out of existence using the events of the "One More Day" story arc, but was not permitted to do so. Spider-Man reacts while confronting the villain Menace by saying there's "enough problems without yet another Grey Goblin to deal with". During the "Dark Reign" storyline, Molecule Man's torment of the Dark Avengers includes Osborn hallucinating Gwen pregnant about to be killed, and one of Norman's male Super Soldier test subjects is identified as "G. Stacy".

Gabriel: American Son II
Gabriel officially returned in the American Son mini-series (although Sarah's whereabouts are still unknown) as the second version of American Son. He introduces himself to Harry Osborn (later known as Harry Lyman) then shoots his half-brother in the chest. American Son appears and saves Harry. After his attempt on Harry's life, Gabriel confronts the American Son battlesuit and demands to know why American Son interfered. It is subsequently revealed that Gabriel has stolen the American Son armor and is now suffering from a split personality, committing crimes as himself while American Son undoes the damage he has caused, identifying itself as the part of Gabriel that recognizes that what he's doing is wrong. Gabriel hears a planned ambush by a police squad and proceeds to attack; before he can do any real damage, however, he is stopped by Spider-Man. After kidnapping reporter Norah Winters and luring Harry to a vacant warehouse, Gabriel makes another attempt on Harry's life. While locked in combat, the half-brothers discuss their respective views of their father. Harry attempts to convince Gabriel that their father is an evil monster who only craves death and power while Gabriel tells Harry that his half-brother's a waste of the Osborn bloodline. Saddened by the inability to reach Gabriel, Harry reveals hacking into the American Son armor and quickly over powers Gabriel. After Gabriel is defeated the warehouse is set on fire and the half-brothers are saved by Spider-Man and a police squad. Following his capture, Gabriel is placed in a psychiatric hospital, and informed that the American Son suit is thought to be destroyed. However, a package is soon delivered to his room containing the American Son helmet and a note from his father telling him of loving Gabriel and missing his son.

Return as Kindred and new origin
An apparent demon going by the name of Kindred rose through the ranks and ultimately hand picked Mysterio to assist him in carrying out a plan of retaliation against Peter Parker, whom Kindred held accountable for an unpardonable sin. When Kindred meets with Norman Osborn in Ravencroft, Norman's Cletus Kasady persona states to Kindred that he has a message for him from Norman, who states that he is "so proud of him".

Norman, cleansed of his sins via Sin-Eater, claimed to the clone of Ashley Kafka that Kindred was his son, and when Kindred revealed itself to Peter it had the face of Harry Osborn. Kindred torments Peter by showing him the corpses of his dead friends and family, putting Peter's soul through the reenactment of Harry Osborn's return, and killing him over and over again as Peter experienced flashbacks to better times with his friends. Norman is able to capture Kindred with the help of Kingpin and speaks to it believing it to be the true Harry, voicing regret over having birthed the sickness in Harry's mind. Planning to redeem the Osborn name, Norman states to Kindred that he will find the truth that he talked about. Spider-Man arrives stating to Norman that he would like to talk to him, and declares he is finished with Harry forever. However, after MJ helps Peter talk through the incident, Peter admits he was lying when he said that and begs a vision of Kindred to tell him what to do.

Kindred begins his next plot starting with Doctor Octopus.

Carlie Cooper is asked to investigate the corpses dug up by Kindred, and is particularly horrified on uncovering an extra one. At that moment she is captured by Kindred and later awakens to find herself a caged prisoner. She finds the non-demonized Harry Lyman is her cellmate, and he tells her that they have no chance of escape.

Kindred tells Doctor Octopus to gather five more people in exchange for helping him with his memories. He starts by helping Sandman solve his immortality problem and uses a special machine to resurrect Electro. As Kindred gets more serum from Chameleon, Doctor Octopus and Electro recruit Kraven the Hunter in exchange for his help in hunting Lizard.

Carlie learns from Harry that he was lured to Europe by Kindred after following a trail of transactions from several dormant Oscorp bank accounts. Arriving at one of his father's former real estate holdings (which bears a resemblance to the building that raised Sarah and Gabriel Stacy), Lyman was attacked and captured by Kindred. He has remained a prisoner for many months. Unbeknownst to Harry, Carlie is keeping something from him...the identity of the corpse she discovered in the morgue belongs to Harry Osborn himself. After Doctor Octopus coerces Curt Connors in using the Isotope Genome Accelerator on himself in order to separate his Lizard side, Kindred plans to add Mysterio to the Sinister Six.

During the "Sinister War" storyline, Kindred prepares for his final meeting with Spider-Man as the Sinister Six get Mysterio into their ranks while fighting the Savage Six.

Carlie attempts to motivate Lyman, reminding him of his family. Harry tells her this is not the first time he has failed them, and that no matter how happy he is, how hard he tries to put things right, something is always there to remind him that none of it is real, and that none of it will ever last. After more coaxing from Carlie, Harry suddenly notices that the door to their cell is open and suggests there is a way to escape.

As Spider-Man struggles against Foreigner's group, the Superior Foes, the Sinister Syndicate, a flashback revealed that Kindred summoned the groups to them and placed centipedes in their heads and will remove them if they kill Spider-Man. Kindred revives Sin-Eater as a zombie. From Sin-Eater's corpse, Kindred unleashes demonic centipedes which possess Grey Gargoyle, Living Laser, Whirlwind, Juggernaut, and Morlun so that Sin-Eater can lead them as part of the "Sinful Six".

Harry and Carlie race through Kindred's catacombs, and find that some of the walls are easy to push over. They find Carlie's morgue on the other end of one, containing a body. Carlie warns Harry not to look, but he does anyway. It is also revealed through flashbacks dating back to Harry's childhood that the cause of most of Harry's personal problems, from addiction to insanity, comes from him having a tortured soul which was traded to the demon Mephisto by Harry's father in exchange for a more prosperous quality of life, which Norman had been struggling to provide for him and his son. Norman is reminded of these deeds when he visits the house in Europe, discovering two cloning pods as well as the old artificial intelligence unit which houses Harry's brain waves. This version of Harry taunts his father.

The A.I. Harry reveals to his father that his half-siblings Gabriel and Sarah Stacy are not in reality Norman's children, and that he never had an intimate relationship with Gwen Stacy. Sarah and Gabriel were part of a major cloning conspiracy orchestrated by him, Mysterio, Mendell Stromm, and The Chameleon. Several versions of the twins were created, but each succumbed to cellular clone degeneration and died. When the latest models were perfected, they were sent out into the world to confront Peter. Gabriel had one further model created that became involved in the American Son storyline. Now both twins have become host bodies for the AI Harry, which is why they have been taking Harry's form and have his memories, and it is revealed there were two Kindreds all along. Harry's A.I. reveals Mysterio rewired his father's memories to make him believe his son had always survived, when in truth he did not. Harry Lyman, uncovering his own body, confesses to Carlie that he knew all along he was never the true Harry, after he and Carlie find a portal that transports them back to his home, Harry checks in on a sleeping Liz and Normie before equipping himself with a goblin glider and pumpkin bombs, and heads back to Kindred's base to confront his final destiny.

In a final battle with the Kindreds, Norman reveals the A.I. Harry had been influenced by Mephisto the entire time and apologizes to Harry for selling his soul. Harry then tells Peter he "made up" the twins and fights with his friend against them. During the battle Harry tells Norman to get to safety; Norman is shocked at this to which Harry replies "Guess the apple fell kinda far from the tree." When Harry steps between Norman and a blow from Gabriel's Kindred body, he is fatally wounded. Collapsing into Peter's arms, Harry tells Peter this was always how it was "meant to be" and dies. Doctor Strange decides to gamble with Mephisto for the fate of Harry Osborn's soul and succeeds. His victory exorcises Mephisto from the twins, allowing them to degenerate and pass on for a final time, and Harry's soul is freed from Mephisto's grasp. Peter and MJ grieve the loss of their friend.

It is revealed in the "Sinister War" event that Gabriel and Sarah are not in fact the children of Gwen, but are in reality part of a massive cloning conspiracy set up by an A.I. computer back-up of Harry's consciousness with additional help from Mendel Stromm, the Chameleon and Mysterio to help exact revenge on both Peter and Norman; Mysterio's role in the scheme was to manipulate Norman and MJ's memories so that they would believe the twins' history with Gwen as their mother and Norman their father, rather than their true origin. Several versions of Sarah and Gabriel were created, each succumbing to cellular clone degeneration; Gabriel had one further model created that was involved in the American Son storyline. Also Mephisto corrupted the A.I. and brought Sarah and Gabriel back into this world after torturing the two in hell, corrupting and transforming the two into demonic revenant soldiers known as the Kindred who would switch places with each other unknown to anyone. Gabriel (using Harry's likeness) carried out most of the retaliation towards Spider-Man, and Norman. Gabriel torments Peter with the corpses of dead friends and family, putting Peter's soul through torment, and killing Peter over and over again as Peter experienced flashbacks to better times with friends. Norman had the Kingpin capture Gabriel but voiced regret over the man's sickness, while Peter is left disillusioned. Meanwhile, Sarah confronts MJ who learns the twins' true origins as the latest clone models, as well as the AI's host bodies, which is why they have Harry's form and memories. It is also revealed the AI of Harry is actually controlled by Mephisto. In a final battle with Gabriel and Sarah as the Kindred, Peter fights against them which results in Harry Lyman's death while saving Norman. Meanwhile, Doctor Strange decides to gamble with Mephisto to free Harry Osborn's soul, selecting Peter and MJ as his champions, and succeeds; the show of unbreakable love between Peter and MJ ultimately exorcises Mephisto from the twins, allowing them to degenerate and pass on for a final time freed from Mephisto's grasp.<ref>{{Cite book|title=The Amazing Spider-Man vol. 5 #75. Marvel Comics.|year=2021}}</ref>

Powers and abilities
Gabriel Stacy and Sarah Stacy aged about 2-3 times faster than normal and were adults within the span of a few years. Their enhanced blood also gave the twins a slight increase in strength, reflexes, healing and endurance. But the aging causes the twins to suffer severe headaches. Sarah's condition was stabilized through a blood transfusion from Spider-Man, leaving her significantly more mentally stable (although her precise strength level is unclear). Meanwhile, Gabriel took the Goblin serum to have his condition stabilized which granted him further increased superhuman strength while also driving him insane as he adopted a Halloween-themed appearance as the Grey Goblin and used an arsenal of high-tech weapons (grenade-like "Pumpkin Bombs" and a bat-shaped "goblin glider"), and later acquired the American Son armor which granted him further strength and stamina.

As Kindred, the twins were bestowed by Mephisto with the demonically enhanced capabilities of immortality, super-strength, and control over the centipedes like the ones that can protrude out of them. Each of the Kindreds possesses super-strength, superhuman stamina, enhanced durability, enhanced reflexes, a healing factor, and genius-level intellect. Their demonic abilities enable them to perform magic and revive the dead, perform entomancy (the ability to control insects like centipedes), dream projection, teleportation, and empowerment.

Other versions
During the "2015 Secret Wars" event, a vampiric Grey Goblin can be seen chasing Blade and Howard the Duck in the Battleworld domain of New Quack City.

Character development
J. Michael Straczynski later stated originally wanting Peter Parker to be the father of Gwen Stacy's twins but the editors vetoed the idea, feeling that having two adult children would age the protagonist too much. It was then decided by the whole creative and editorial team that Norman Osborn would be the twins' father. Ultimately, the twins were eventually retconned not to be Stacy's and Osborn's children, but clones created by an A.I. of Norman's son Harry, serving as the true dual identity of Kindred, partly due to the huge backlash the original storyline caused among the fans, angered by the distortion of Gwen Stacy's character after the revelation of her supposed sexual intercourse with a creepy and evil man like Norman Osborn.

In other media
The Grey Goblin appears in Spider-Man Unlimited as an alternative version of the Green Goblin.

Reception
 In 2020, CBR.com ranked the Kindred 5th in their "Marvel: Dark Spider-Man Villains, Ranked From Lamest To Coolest" list.
 In 2022, Screen Rant'' ranked Kindred 3rd in their "10 Most Powerful Silk Villains In Marvel Comics" list.

References

External links
 Gabriel Stacy at the Marvel Universe
 Gabriel Stacy at the Marvel Database Project
 Gabriel Stacy at Spider Fan
 Sarah Stacy at the Marvel Database Project
 Sarah Stacy at Spider Fan

Characters created by J. Michael Straczynski
Characters created by Mike Deodato
Clone characters in comics
Comics characters introduced in 2004
Comics characters introduced in 2018
Fictional goblins
Fictional twins
Marvel Comics characters who can move at superhuman speeds
Marvel Comics characters who use magic
Marvel Comics characters with accelerated healing
Marvel Comics characters with superhuman strength
Marvel Comics demons
Marvel Comics martial artists
Marvel Comics mutates
Spider-Man characters